UAAP Season 63 is the 2000–01 athletic year of the University Athletic Association of the Philippines, which was hosted by the University of Santo Tomas. The season opened on July 15, 2000, at the Araneta Coliseum.

It was the Studio 23's first broadcast.

Basketball

Men's tournament

Elimination round

Playoffs

Overall championship race

Juniors' division

Seniors' division

Broadcast notes
The UAAP games was the first telecast on Studio 23 now ABS-CBN Sports and Action, it has produced by ABS-CBN Sports presentation until now. The UAAP broadcast partners from the alternative program Metropolitan Basketball Association a regional-pro league between Sev Sarmenta, Bill Velasco, Bob Novales, Mico Halili, Jude Turcuato, and Alex Santos the presenters and the other hand color analyst is Randy Sacdalan (2000–2004), Danny Francisco, Chot Reyes, Freddie Webb, Butch Maniego and others. The UAAP sideline reporters are officially named the student reporter between Pia Arcangel and others.

See also
NCAA Season 76

External links
PinoyExchange.com - UAAP 63 Overall Standings
PinoyExchange.com - UAAP 63 theme
Peyups.com: UP places second in 63rd UAAP season
Ateneo de Manila High School: Interschool Athletics Campaign

 
2000 in Philippine sport
63